Mark Plotkin (born December 2, 1998) is a Canadian chess player and coach. He holds the FIDE title of International Master.

Biography
Mark Plotkin was born in Israel to Victor Plotkin, FIDE Master and the captain of the Canadian Olympiad team. He attended the University of Toronto where he helped the team win the Canadian University Chess Championship. During the pandemic chess boom, Mark became a full time chess teacher, with students all across North America, while still continuing to participate in Grandmaster norm tournaments. In 2021, Plotkin won the popular Canadian Banff Chess Tournament, finishing ahead of Grandmaster Joel Benjamin. In 2022, Plotkin finished 5th in the Titled Tuesday Tournament, ahead of strong Grandmasters like Baadur Jobava, Dmitry Andreikin, Hans Niemann and Samuel Sevian. Currently, Plotkin is ranked number 16 among active players in Canada. and has a CFC rating of over 2500.

References

External links
 
 
 

1998 births
Living people
Canadian chess players
Chess International Masters